Idan Nachmias (born 17 March 1997) is an Israeli professional footballer who plays as a centre-back for Maccabi Tel Aviv and the Israel national team.

Early life
Nachmias was born in kibbutz Ein Zivan, Israel, to an Israeli family of Sephardic Jewish descent. He was grew up in moshav Ani'am, Israel.

Club career
Nachmias made his professional debut for Ironi Kiryat Shmona in the Israeli Premier League on 6 May 2017, coming on as a substitute in the 58th minute for Ahmed Abed against Hapoel Kfar Saba, which finished as a 1–4 home loss.

On 21 June 2021, Nachmias signed for 4 years in Maccabi Tel Aviv.

International career
Nachmias made his international debut for Israel on 14 October 2020 in the UEFA Nations League, coming on as a substitute for Orel Dgani in the third minute of second-half stoppage time against Slovakia. The away match finished as a 3–2 win.

Career statistics

International

See also 
 List of Jewish footballers
 List of Jews in sports
 List of Israelis

References

External links
 
 
 

1997 births
Living people
Israeli Jews
Israeli Sephardi Jews
Israeli footballers
Hapoel Ironi Kiryat Shmona F.C. players
Maccabi Tel Aviv F.C. players
Israel youth international footballers
Israel under-21 international footballers
Israel international footballers
Association football central defenders
Israeli Premier League players
Footballers from Northern District (Israel)